TAT-5 was AT&T Corporation's 5th transatlantic telephone cable,
in operation from 1970 to 1993, carrying 720 3kHz channels, between Rhode Island, United States and Conil de la Frontera, (Cádiz), Spain. It had 361 repeaters.

References

Infrastructure completed in 1970
Transatlantic communications cables
Spain–United States relations
1970 establishments in Rhode Island
1970 establishments in Spain
1993 disestablishments in Rhode Island
1993 disestablishments in Spain